The following is a list of films originally produced and/or distributed theatrically by Metro-Goldwyn-Mayer and released between 1940 and 1949.

See also 
 Lists of Metro-Goldwyn-Mayer films

References 

1940-1949
American films by studio
1940s in American cinema
Lists of 1940s films